Vaad Hatzalah (the Rescue Committee or Committee for Rescuing) was an organization to rescue Jews in Europe from the Holocaust, which was founded in November 1939 by the Union of Orthodox Rabbis of the United States and Canada (Agudath Harabbanim).

The organization was originally named Emergency Committee for War-Torn Yeshivas and it is often referred to as "the Rescue Committee" also formally named: Vaad ha-Hatzala in Hebrew.

Activities

Recognizing that following the law would lead to greater numbers of Jews being murdered, the Vaad sometimes used means that were illegal.

For example, the Polish government-in-exile ambassador in Bern, Aleksander Ładoś, sent coded cables to New York City on behalf of the Vaad and related Jewish organizations. The United States State Department had issued orders to block messages coming from Europe regarding news of the Nazis extermination of the Jews.

See also
 Survivors' Talmud

References

Jewish refugee aid organizations
Organizations which rescued Jews during the Holocaust
The Holocaust and the United States